The Scottish Premiership is Scotland's highest level association football competition and has been since 2013.

Scottish Premiership may also refer to:

 Scottish Premiership (rugby), Scottish rugby union amateur league competition
 Scottish Premiership Division One, top division of the rugby Scottish Premiership
 Scottish Premiership Division Two, second division of the rugby Scottish Premiership
 Scottish Premiership Division Three, third division of the rugby Scottish Premiership

See also
 Scottish Football League Premier Division,  the highest level football league competition in Scotland from 1975 to 1998
 Scottish Premier League, the highest level football league competition in Scotland from 1998 to 2013